Klismaphilia (or klysmaphilia), from the Greek words  ("enema", from , "deluge, flood") and  ("love"), is a paraphilia involving enjoyment of, and sexual arousal from, enemas.

History
The term klismaphilia was coined in 1973 by Dr. Joanne Denko, an early investigator in this field, in her article "Klismaphilia: Enema as a Sexual Preference[:] Report of Two Cases," to describe the activities of some of her patients, whom she referred to as klismaphiliacs. Klismaphile has come into use as a synonym for klismaphiliac.

Manifestation

Klismaphiles might gain pleasure from a large, water distended belly or the feeling of internal pressure. An enema fetish may include the sexual attraction to the equipment, processes, environments, situations, or scenarios, and some may be sexually aroused by the preparations, such as by the feel and smell of a latex rubber or plastic syringe, by the smell of soapsuds enema solution, or by preparing the recipient. Often, klismaphiles report discovering these desires after a chance administration of an enema sometime in their childhood, but some do report discovering these feelings later on. Klismaphiles can gain satisfaction of enemas through fantasies, by actually receiving or giving one, or through the process of eliminating steps to being administered one (e.g., under the pretense of being constipated). Usually, klismaphiles carry out normal lives and successfully engage in this behavior secretly.

An enema can be an auxiliary to, or a substitute for, genital sexual activity.

That some women use enemas while masturbating was documented by Alfred Kinsey in "Sexual Behavior in the Human Female." He stated, "There still other masturbatory techniques which were regularly or occasionally employed by some 11 percent of the females in the sample ... enemas, and other anal insertions, ... were employed."

Sadomasochistic activities may incorporate enemas for erotic humiliation or for physical discomfort. BDSM punishment scenes can involve administering an enema in a manner that is humiliating and painful and for producing pain and cramps an extra-large volumes or highly irritating substances can be injected. Among the attractions to enema play in BDSM are erotic humiliation, dominance and submission, discipline, psychodrama, power exchange, and so on. An erotic enema allows acting out vulnerability in a primal form.

Classification

The Diagnostic and Statistical Manual of Mental Disorders (DSM-IV-TR) classifies klismaphilia under the diagnosis of "Paraphilias, Not Otherwise Specified". The diagnostic code is 302.9. Proactive treatment for klismaphilics is not generally recommended, due to the lack of any significant desire to be "cured". Health treatment for klismaphilia thus is typically only focused on ensuring the techniques employed and chemicals used are not harmful to the practitioner. Caution should always be maintained on the part of the practitioners experimenting with new techniques and concoctions; in certain cases cramps produced by the chemicals used have led to hospitalizations, in other circumstances the effects can even be life-threatening.

References

Sources 
 
 

Anal eroticism
Paraphilias
Sexual acts

sv:Parafili#Exempel på parafilier